Andrew James Giles (born 31 July 1973) is an Australian politician. He has been a Labor member of the Australian House of Representatives since September 2013, representing the Division of Scullin, Victoria. He is currently the Minister for Immigration, Citizenship and Multicultural Affairs. Giles joined the ALP when he was eighteen, and – prior to his election to Parliament – worked as a principal lawyer at Slater and Gordon in Melbourne, practising in employment law.
Giles previously served as Shadow Assistant Minister for Schools between 2016–2019, and Shadow Minister for Multicultural Affairs and Shadow Minister for Cities and Urban Infrastructure from 2019–2022. 
Giles also previously served as one of the two federal parliamentary convenors of the Labor Left faction, along with Pat Conroy.

Early life and education
Giles was born in Melbourne on 31 July 1973. His mother was born in the United Kingdom, making him a British citizen by descent; he renounced his dual citizenship before standing for parliament in 2013. Giles attended high school at Scotch College, Melbourne. Giles has a Bachelor of Arts and Laws from the University of Melbourne. Before entering parliament, he was a principal solicitor for Slater and Gordon and as a senior associate at Holding Redlich lawyers and consultants. He acted as a solicitor for refugees stranded aboard the MV Tampa. Giles also worked as a senior advisor for the Bracks and Brumby Governments in Victoria. He was secretary of the Socialist Left in Victoria.

Parliamentary career

Giles was elected to parliament at the 2013 federal election, replacing the retiring Harry Jenkins in the Division of Scullin. He immediately took up a position as Labor's cities taskforce and has engaged in an Australia-wide cities listening tour. He is co-chair of Parliamentary friends of Amnesty International, and the deputy chair of the Parliament's Northern Europe group of its IPU members.

In 2016 he was elevated to the position of the Shadow Assistant Minister for Schools.
In 2019 he became a member of Labor's Shadow Ministry. His portfolios included: Multicultural Affairs, Cities and Urban Infrastructure. He also served as the Shadow Minister Assisting for Immigration and Citizenship. In this role Giles led Labor's campaign to stop the Morrison Government's attempts to privatise Australia's visa system. He was also responsible for Labor's ‘reboot’ with multicultural communities, including the establishment of a Multicultural Caucus Committee to inform future policy development.

Personal life

Giles has two children and lives with his wife, Dr Jillian Constable. In the 1990s, he played guitar in an indie rock band called Ether, along with James Cecil, who went on to play in bands such as Architecture in Helsinki.

References

1973 births
Living people
Australian Labor Party members of the Parliament of Australia
Members of the Australian House of Representatives for Scullin
Members of the Australian House of Representatives
21st-century Australian politicians
Australian people of British descent
People who lost British citizenship
Labor Left politicians
People educated at Scotch College, Melbourne